Kendall Ryan may refer to:

 Kendall Ryan (cyclist) (born 1992), American racing cyclist
 Kendall Ryan (novelist) (born 1981), American novelist